1st November of 1954 Great Mosque is a mosque in the city of Batna, Algeria.

History 
The Construction of the mosque began in 1980. It was constructed as an installation to celebrate Islam. It was completed in 2003.

Site 
The mosque is located in the street bound to the city of Biskra. It has a area of 42,000 square meters with a  maximum capacity of 30,000 worshipers.

Gallery

References

Batna, Algeria
Buildings and structures in Batna Province
Mosques completed in 2003
Mosques in Algeria
21st-century religious buildings and structures in Algeria